Tomchrasky is a village in Glen Moriston, in Inverness-shire, Scottish Highlands and is in the Scottish council area of Highland. The village lies on the north banks of the  River Moriston.

References

Populated places in Inverness committee area